ESSP may refer to:

 Earth System Science Partnership, a partnership under the auspices of the ICSU for the integrated study of the Earth system
 East Side Spirit and Pride, a club in East Los Angeles College
 Norrköping Airport (ICAO code: ESSP), an airport situated around three km from the city center of Norrköping, Sweden